Ozothamnus rosmarinifolius, common name rosemary everlasting,  is a species of plant in the family Asteraceae.

Etymology
The species name rosmarinifolius means with leaves like rosemary. The genus name derives from the Greek, ozos (meaning branch) and thamnos (meaning shrub).

Description
It is an upright evergreen shrub. Leaves are narrow, silvery-grey. These plants form quite compact slightly rounded terminal clusters of pink buds. The white flowers are tiny and scented. Bracts range from yellowish to reddish. Flowering time lasts from November to February

Bibliography
Walter Erhardt, Erich Götz, Nils Bödeker, Siegmund Seybold: Der große Zander. Eugen Ulmer KG, Stuttgart 2008, . (Ger.)
Christoper Brickell (Editor-in-chief): RHS A-Z Encyclopedia of Garden Plants. Third edition. Dorling Kindersley, London 2003, .

References

rosmarinifolius